Gulzarpur , (Gurmukhi: ਗੁਲਜ਼ਾਰਪੁਰ), is a village in Multan District in West Punjab, Pakistan. It is located at 30°6'0N 71°34'0E lying to the south-east of the district capital Multan - with an altitude of 114 metres (377 feet).

References

Populated places in Multan District